The  Turkmenian thin-toed gecko (Tenuidactylus turcmenicus) is a species of gecko that is found in eastern Turkmenistan and northern Afghanistan.

References 

Tenuidactylus
Reptiles described in 1978